The Crest Theatre, formerly known as Majestic Crest and Bigfoot Crest Theatre, is a movie theatre located in the Westwood neighborhood of Los Angeles, California, United States. It was founded as the UCLAN in 1941, and was built for live performances but switched to a newsreel cinema during World War II. Through ownership changes, it has been known at various times as UCLAN Theatre, Crest Theatre, and Metro Theatre. The original 500-seat art deco style theater was designed by Arthur W. Hawes.

In October 2018, with support from Susan Nimoy and an anonymous donor, UCLA’s Center for the Art of Performance and The School of Arts & Architecture acquired Crest Theatre. When it reopens following an extensive renovation, the name will be changed to the UCLA Nimoy Theatre, in honor of Nimoy's husband, the late Leonard Nimoy.

History
Arthur Hawes designed the theater in an austere Moderne style for financer Frances Seymour Fonda, wife of Henry and mother of Jane and Peter, as a live performance theater. The theatre was opened in 1941 as the UCLAN.

The venue was changed over to being a movie theater which was exclusively devoted to newsreels during World War II. After the war ended, the theater featured foreign films.

Crest Theater
After being renamed the Crest Theater, avant-garde films began screening there including Dr. Strangelove, Rosemary's Baby, Goodbye, Columbus and Bob & Carol & Ted & Alice.

Pacific Theatres purchased Crest in 1985. Late in the 1980s, Disney purchased a controlling stake in one of Pacific's chain that held El Capitan Theatre and the Crest.

Disney's Buena Vista Theaters and Pacific began renovated the Crest in 1987 with its motif changed to a Hollywood fantasy-land. Joseph Musil was engaged to overhaul the theater's interior. The first part of the renovations was upgrading its film and sound systems which was done before the 1987 opening of Three Men and a Baby. The next phase was to re-theme the theater in an Art Deco motif while rehabbing the lobby, auditorium, restrooms and seats. This was finished by the 1988 premiere of Big Business. Disney ended their partnership in the Crest in 2002.

Eventually Pacific sold the theater to independent operator Robert Bucksbaum in 2003 then renamed Majestic Crest Theater after the 2001 film The Majestic. In 2008, it was designated Historic Landmark No. 919 by the city of Los Angeles, California.

In September 2010, the theater was purchased by Bigfoot Entertainment and managed by the Carmike theater chain for around $4 million. Bigfoot's scheduling was improved by Carmike getting a number of higher profile movies and would include niche showings, midnight horror movie, Asian Film Nights and an annual film festival. The renamed Bigfoot Crest Theater was acquired to show films acquired or produced by Bigfoot. The Crest hosted the Singafest Asian Film Festival until late October 2011 after which the theater was closed for remodeling. Carmike ended their management of the theater at that time. Bigfoot placed the building up for sale by December 2011. The theatre closed again in October 2012 while being still for sale.

In August 2013, after being closed about 19 months, the theatre had reopened under new management with a series of ballet and opera screenings as the Crest. The theatre announcing their intention to program more movies and events in the future. For example, the last Friday of the month the theatre has a surfing series showing surfing movies.

In popular culture 
 Larry David attends a film screening at The Crest for the pilot episode of Curb Your Enthusiasm

References

External links 
 
 The Majestic Crest, Los Angeles at Flickriver.com
 Majestic Crest Theatre at Cinema Treasures
 The Crest Theatre on Cinema Sightlines

Cinemas and movie theaters in Los Angeles
Westwood, Los Angeles
Theatres completed in 1939
1939 establishments in California